Mostafa Fateh was an Iranian economist and socialist politician who led the Comrades Party in the 1940s.

From 1921 to 1951, Fateh served in the Anglo-Iranian Oil Company (APOC) and is noted as the company's highest-ranking Iranian employee for decades.

References

1896 births
1978 deaths
Columbia University alumni
Iranian bankers
Iranian socialists
Comrades Party politicians